57 Cygni is a close binary star system in the constellation Cygnus, located about 530 light years from Earth. It is visible to the naked eye as a blue-white hued star with a baseline apparent visual magnitude of 4.80. The pair have a magnitude difference of 0.34. This system is moving closer to the Earth with a heliocentric radial velocity of −21 km/s.

This is a double-lined spectroscopic binary with an orbital period of 2.85 days and an eccentricity of 0.15. The system does not form an eclipsing binary, having the orbital inclination of around 48°. Both components are B-type main-sequence stars with a stellar classification of B5 V.

References

B-type main-sequence stars
Spectroscopic binaries
Cygnus (constellation)
Durchmusterung objects
Cygni, 57
199081
103089
8001
Suspected variables